A gas chamber is an apparatus for killing humans or other animals with gas, consisting of a sealed chamber into which a poisonous or asphyxiant gas is introduced. Poisonous agents used include hydrogen cyanide and carbon monoxide.

History
General Rochambeau developed a rudimentary method in 1803, during the Haitian Revolution, filling ships' cargo holds with sulfur dioxide to suffocate prisoners of war. The scale of these operations was brought to larger public attention in the 2005 book Napoleon's Crimes, although the allegations of scale and sources were heavily questioned.

In America, the utilization of a gas chamber was first proposed by Allan McLane Hamilton to the state of Nevada. Since then, gas chambers have been used as a method of execution of condemned prisoners in the United States and continue to be a legal execution method in three states, seeing a possible, legislated reintroduction, although redundant in practice since the early 1990s.

Lithuania used gas chambers for civilian, penal use in the 1930s, with the last known execution carried out in 1940. The Soviet Union allegedly used the method to perform executions during the bloody Great Purge, including by use of gas vans. Prisoners were gassed on the way to the Butovo firing range, where the NKVD normally executed its prisoners by shooting them. None of these saw mass use, however, and were strictly for "criminal" purposes.

Most notably, during the Holocaust large-scale gas chambers designed for mass killing were used by Nazi Germany from the late 1930s, as part of the Aktion T4, and later for its genocide program.

More recently, escapees from North Korea have alleged executions to have been performed by gas chamber in prison camps, often combined with medical experimentation.

Germany

Nazi Germany made extensive use of various types of gas chambers for mass-murder during the Holocaust.

Beginning in 1939, gas chambers were used as part of Aktion T4, an "involuntary euthanasia" program under which the Nazis murdered people with physical and intellectual disabilities, whom the Nazis considered "unworthy of life". Experiments in the gassing of patients were conducted in October 1939 in occupied Posen in Poland. Hundreds of prisoners were murdered by carbon monoxide poisoning in an improvised gas chamber. In 1940 gas chambers using bottled pure carbon monoxide were established at six killing centres in Germany. In addition to persons with disabilities, these centres were also used during Action 14f13 to murder prisoners transferred from concentration camps in Germany, Austria, and Poland. Concentration camp inmates continued to be murdered even after the euthanasia program was officially shut down in 1941.

During the invasion of Russia, mass executions by exhaust gas were performed by Einsatzgruppen using gas vans, trucks modified to divert engine exhaust into a sealed interior gas chamber.

Starting in 1941, gas chambers were used at extermination camps in Poland for the mass-murder of Jews, Roma, and other victims of the Holocaust. Gas vans were used at the Chełmno extermination camp. The Operation Reinhard extermination camps at Bełżec, Sobibór, and Treblinka used exhaust fumes from stationary diesel engines. In search of more efficient killing methods, the Nazis experimented with using the hydrogen cyanide-based fumigant Zyklon B at the Auschwitz concentration camp. This method was adopted for mass-murder at the Auschwitz and Majdanek camps. Up to 6,000 victims were gassed with Zyklon B each day at Auschwitz.

Most extermination camp gas chambers were dismantled or destroyed in the last months of World War II as Soviet troops approached, except for those at Dachau, Sachsenhausen and Majdanek. One destroyed gas chamber at Auschwitz was reconstructed after the war to stand as a memorial.

North Korea
Kwon Hyok, a former head of security at Camp 22, described laboratories equipped with gas chambers for suffocation gas experiments, in which three or four people, normally a family, are the experimental subjects. After the chambers are sealed and poison is injected through a tube, while scientists observe from above through glass. In a report reminiscent of an earlier account of a family of seven, Kwon claims to have watched one family of two parents, a son and a daughter die from suffocating gas, with the parents trying to save the children using mouth-to-mouth resuscitation for as long as they had the strength. Kwon's testimony was supported by documents from Camp 22 describing the transfer of prisoners designated for the experiments. The documents were identified as genuine by Kim Sang Hun, a London-based expert on Korea and human rights activist.

Lithuania
In 1937–1940, Lithuania operated a gas chamber in Aleksotas within the First Fort of the Kaunas Fortress. Previous executions were carried out by hanging or by shooting. However, these methods were viewed as brutal and in January 1937, the criminal code was amended to provide execution by gas which at the time was viewed as more civilized and humane. Lithuania considered and rejected execution by poison. Unlike the American or German model the Lithuanian gas chamber, built out of bricks, worked by inputting compressed lethal gas from an external storage cylinder (Černevičiūtė 2014). The first execution was carried on July 27, 1937: Bronius Pogužinskas, age 37, convicted of murder of five people from a Jewish family. Historian Sigita Černevičiūtė counted at least nine executions in the gas chamber, though records are incomplete and fragmentary. Of the nine, eight were convicted of murder. One of these, Aleksandras Maurušaitis, was also convicted of anti-government actions during the 1935 Suvalkija strike. The last known execution took place on May 19, 1940 for robbery. The fate of the gas chamber after the occupation by the Soviet Union in June 1940 is unclear.

Soviet Union

According to Zhirnov, Soviet NKVD commander Isay Berg adapted vans with the storage compartment sealed and exhaust redirected inside it.

United States

Gas chambers have been used for capital punishment in the United States to execute death row inmates. The first person to be executed in the United States by lethal gas was Gee Jon, on February 8, 1924. An unsuccessful attempt to pump poison gas directly into his cell at Nevada State Prison led to the development of the first makeshift gas chamber to carry out Jon's death sentence.

On December 3, 1948, Miran Thompson and Sam Shockley were executed in the gas chamber at San Quentin State Prison for their role in the Battle of Alcatraz.

In 1957, Burton Abbott was executed as the governor of California, Goodwin J. Knight, was on the telephone to stay the execution.

Since the restoration of the death penalty in the United States in 1976, 11 executions by gas chamber have been conducted. Four were conducted in Mississippi, 2 in Arizona, 2 in California, 2 in North Carolina, and 1 in Nevada. The first execution via gas chamber since the restoration of the death penalty was in Nevada in 1979, when Jesse Bishop was executed for murder. The most recent execution via gas chamber was in 1999. By the 1980s, reports of suffering during gas chamber executions had led to controversy over the use of this method.

At the September 2, 1983, execution of Jimmy Lee Gray in Mississippi, officials cleared the viewing room after 8 minutes while Gray was still alive and gasping for air. The decision to clear the room while he was still alive was criticized by his attorney. In 2007, David Bruck, an attorney specializing in death penalty cases, said, "Jimmy Lee Gray died banging his head against a steel pole in the gas chamber while reporters counted his moans."

During the April 6, 1992, execution of Donald Eugene Harding in Arizona, it took 11 minutes for death to occur. The prison warden stated that he would quit if required to conduct another gas chamber execution. Following Harding's execution, Arizona voted that all persons condemned to death after November 1992 would be executed by lethal injection.

Following the execution of Robert Alton Harris in 1992, a federal court declared that "execution by lethal gas under the California protocol is unconstitutionally cruel and unusual." By the late 20th century, most states had switched to methods considered to be more humane, such as lethal injection. California's gas chamber at San Quentin State Prison was converted to an execution chamber for lethal injection.

As of 2020, the last person to be executed in the gas chamber was German national Walter LaGrand, sentenced to death before 1992, who was executed in Arizona on March 3, 1999. The U.S. Court of Appeals for the Ninth Circuit had ruled that he could not be executed by gas chamber, but the decision was overturned by the United States Supreme Court. The gas chamber was formerly used in Colorado, Nevada, New Mexico, North Carolina and Oregon. Six states (Arizona, California, Maryland, Mississippi, Missouri, and Wyoming) authorize lethal gas if lethal injection cannot be administered, the condemned committed their crime before a certain date, or the condemned chooses to die in the gas chamber. In October 2010, Governor of New York David Paterson signed a bill rendering gas chambers illegal for use by humane societies and other animal shelters.

Method of use

Using hydrogen cyanide

As implemented in the United States, the gas chamber is considered to be the most dangerous, most complicated, most time-consuming and most expensive method of administering the death penalty. It is also notoriously impossible to halt once initiated, which has occurred in the case of stays, such as in the case of Burton Abbott. The same event supposedly occurred in the final, completed execution of Caryl Chessman in 1960. The condemned person is strapped into a chair within an airtight chamber, which is then sealed. The executioner activates a mechanism which drops potassium cyanide (or sodium cyanide) pellets into a bath of sulfuric acid beneath the chair; the ensuing chemical reaction generates lethal hydrogen cyanide gas.

The gas is visible to the condemned, who is advised to take several deep breaths to speed unconsciousness. Nonetheless, the condemned person often convulses and drools and may also urinate, defecate, and vomit.

Following the execution the chamber is purged with air, and any remnant gas is neutralized with anhydrous ammonia, after which the body can be removed (with great caution, as pockets of gas can be trapped in the victim's clothing).

Excluding all oxygen

Nitrogen gas or oxygen-depleted air has been considered for human execution, as it can induce nitrogen asphyxiation. The victim detects little abnormal sensation as the oxygen level falls. This leads to asphyxiation (death from lack of oxygen) without the painful and traumatic feeling of suffocation, or the side effects of poisoning.

In April 2015, Oklahoma Governor Mary Fallin approved a bill allowing nitrogen asphyxiation as an execution method. On March 14, 2018, Oklahoma Attorney General Mike Hunter and Corrections Director Joe M. Allbaugh announced a switch to nitrogen gas as the state's primary method of execution. After struggling for years to design a nitrogen execution protocol, the State of Oklahoma announced in February 2020 that it was abandoning the project after finding a reliable source of drugs to carry out the lethal injection executions.

In 2018, Alabama approved nitrogen asphyxiation as an execution method and allowed death row inmates a choice of method. In September 2022, an execution by lethal injection was stayed by a court because the inmate claimed to have made the election of nitrogen asphyxiation, but the form had been lost.

Further reading
Christianson, Scott (2010). The Last Gasp: The rise and fall of the American gas chamber (Kindle edition). Berkeley: University of California Press,

References

External links 

 

Infrastructure of the Holocaust
Execution methods
Execution equipment
Toxicology